Andrzej Świetlicki (19 April 1915 – 21 June 1940) was a Polish politician, a member of the far-right National Radical Camp Falanga. After the 1939 German invasion of Poland, in October 1939 he formed a pro-collaborationist National Radical Organization (Narodowa Organizacja Radykalna). After a few months of collaboration with the Germans (Abwehr and Gestapo) he was arrested in the German AB-Aktion and executed on 20/21 June 1940 in the Palmiry massacre.

References

1915 births
1940 deaths
20th-century Polish politicians
People executed by Nazi Germany by firing squad
Polish people executed by Nazi Germany
Polish civilians killed in World War II

Executed Polish collaborators with Nazi Germany